Southern Buddhism, Eastern Buddhism, and Northern Buddhism are geographical terms sometimes used to describe the styles of Buddhism practised in East Asia and Mainland Southeast Asia.

Southern Buddhism

"Southern Buddhism" represents Buddhism as practiced in Sri Lanka and countries in Mainland Southeast Asia, especially Cambodia, Laos, Myanmar (Burma), and Thailand. This group is primarily connected by the Pāli Canon, monasticism and its prevalent monastic rules, and ritual practices. Southern Buddhism tends to be in agreement that the canonical Pali scriptures and commentaries are considered its textual authority, and a strong monastic tradition along with the ideal of renunciation (considered the best way to live one's life) allows its adherents to disregard worldly concerns and devote all of their attention to religious practice. It is usually considered to be synonymous with the Theravada. Theravada means from the elders; teaching come from immediate disciple of Buddha, Ananda and Kassapa. Buddhists in this region place their trust in the Triple Gem: Buddha, Dharma, and Sangha and is of utmost important in order to seek refuge to the Triple Gem for conducting a Buddhist ritual. The sangha includes both nuns and lay supports of the monastic community while referring to the overall body of the spiritually advanced community. However, monks are predominately the symbol of the sangha and the symbol of many individual's worship. Ranking for the sangha is based on seniority by the time of entry and gender, while many decisions are made ideally by consensus.

Southern Buddhism Monastic Members 
The monastic members of Southern Buddhism are characterized by celibacy, detachment, and monastic discipline. These monastic members are valued above the lay Buddhist. There are two distinctions of monastic members, those with book duty, where they would be a resident in a monastic institution intending to preserve and teach the traditions that are passed down, whereas those on meditation duty would instead focus on gaining realizations (often through reclusive forest retreats). The monastic community is an important social institution that provides education and social mobility for the bright and ambitious.

Northern Buddhism

"Northern Buddhism" sometimes refers to Buddhism as practiced in East Asia and the Tibetan region- particularly China, Japan, Korea, Mongolia, Nepal, Taiwan, Tibet, and Vietnam, and formerly in India before the decline of Buddhism in India. It is often held to be synonymous with Mahayana. However, the term Northern Buddhism is also sometimes used to refer specifically to Tibetan (including Mongolian) Buddhism. In this terminology, the Buddhism of China, Japan etc. is called Eastern Buddhism. The Brill Dictionary of Religion uses the term Northern Buddhism in a sense exclusive of Vajrayana or tantric Buddhism.

In early Buddhism, doctrinal variations did not necessarily imply separate organizations, so the Mahāyāna movement spread within rather than institutionally separating itself from the early monastic orders. The same is generally true of Tibetan Buddhist monasticism; the monastic code followed is that of the Mūlasarvastivāda, an ancient Indian order. Tibetan Buddhists also share Mahayana and Vajrayana (tantric) practices and perspectives, while they are divided into monastic orders are loosely organized schools based on different lineages of teachers and not, in most cases, on strictly doctrinal differences. Additionally, the main four traditions are Kagyu (bka' brgyud), Sakya (sa skya'), Nyingma (rnying ma), and Geluk (dge lugs), but each of these major schools contains groupings within it, which may be to a greater or lesser extent autonomous. Certain doctrinal positions or specialisms in specific practices are associated with each school, but just as in the ancient Buddhist orders, there are no rigid sectarian boundaries. The Buddhism of this branch derives from later Indian Buddhism especially of the Pāla dynasty (Bengal, Bihar eighth to twelfth centuries CE), incorporating Buddhist monastic scholarship, Mahāyāna, and tantric traditions. It preserves large collections of scriptural and commentarial texts in Tibetan language, including a comprehensive set of translations from Sanskrit sources as well as a vast indigenous literature.

Mahayana and Theravada in Asia
The use and meaning of these terms reflects only the contemporary situation of the various schools of Buddhism in Asia, and even that only imperfectly.  While the Theravada presently dominates in Southeast Asia, prior to the 13th century the Mahayana was also well established in that region.  The survival of certain Mahayana notions in popular Southeast Asian Buddhism (such as the worship of Lokesvara- a form of Avalokitesvara- in Thailand) reflect the early presence of Mahayana ideology in the "Southern Buddhist" world.  Ongoing contact between Southeast Asia and India brought a variety of doctrines, relics, and texts into Southeast Asia from both the Mahayana and Vajrayana traditions, as well as the Theravada and the other early Buddhist schools.  Only after the decline of Buddhism in India did Theravada Buddhism begin to dominate in Southeast Asia, with Theravada-dominated Sri Lanka replacing India as the source of new texts and teachers.

In East Asia and Tibet, the lands traditionally described as "Northern Buddhist", share Mahayana and Vajrayana (tantric) practices and perspectives, while they are divided into monastic orders or loosely organized schools based on different lineages of teachers and not, in most cases, on strictly doctrinal differences. The main four traditions are Kagyu, Sakya, Nyingma, and Geluk, but each of these major schools contains groupings within it, which may be to a greater or lesser extent autonomous. The historical evidence for the cohabitation of Mahayana and non-Mahayana monks in some South Asian monasteries during the spread of Buddhism from India to East Asia provides additional evidence that the form of Buddhism practiced in the "Northern" territories likely retains many non-Mahayana influences.  Furthermore, in certain regions of China and East Asia (notably in Southern China), non-Mahayana forms were sometimes dominant.

Vietnam represents an interesting case of a country lying in the liminal region between the Northern and Southern Buddhist schools. As might be expected, Vietnamese Buddhism shows both a strong Mahayana and Theravada influence.

Notes

References

Citations
 Lopez Jr., Donald S., "Introduction in Buddhism in Practice, Donald S. Lopez Jr., Ed., Princeton University Press, Princeton, NJ, 1995. 

Schools of Buddhism